The Hungary men's national under-18 ice hockey team is the men's national under-18 ice hockey team of Hungary. The team is controlled by the Hungarian Ice Hockey Federation, a member of the International Ice Hockey Federation. The team represents Hungary at the IIHF World U18 Championships.

International competitions

IIHF World U18 Championships

1999: 7th in Pool B
2000: 4th in Division I Europe
2001: 7th in Division II
2002: 6th in Division II
2003: 2nd in Division II Group B
2004: 2nd in Division II Group A
2005: 1st in Division II Group A
2006: 6th in Division I Group A
2007: 2nd in Division II Group A
2008: 1st in Division II Group B

2009: 3rd in Division I Group A
2010: 2nd in Division I Group B
2011: 4th in Division I Group A
2012: 6th in Division I Group B
2013: 1st in Division II Group A
2014: 1st in Division I Group B
2015: 6th in Division I Group A
2016: 1st in Division I Group B
2017: 6th in Division I Group A

External links
Hungary at IIHF.com

under
National under-18 ice hockey teams